Isidoro Alverà (born 2 March 1945) is an Italian ice hockey player. He competed in the men's tournament at the 1964 Winter Olympics.

References

External links
 

1945 births
Living people
Olympic ice hockey players of Italy
Ice hockey players at the 1964 Winter Olympics
People from Cortina d'Ampezzo
Sportspeople from the Province of Belluno